Discovery Park is one of the 17 constituencies in the Tsuen Wan District.

The constituency returns one district councillor to the Tsuen Wan District Council, with an election every four years. The seat has been currently held by Lau Cheuk-Yu.
Discovery Park constituency is loosely based on the Discovery Park and Tsuen King Garden with estimated population of 16,074.

Councillors represented

Election results

2010s

2000s

1990s

References

Tsuen Wan
Constituencies of Hong Kong
Constituencies of Tsuen Wan District Council
1999 establishments in Hong Kong
Constituencies established in 1999